The List of shipwrecks in 1784 includes some ship sunk, wrecked or otherwise lost during 1784.

January

2 January

3 January

7 January

8 January

10 January

11 January

15 January

17 January

18 January

21 January

22 January

23 January

31 January

Unknown date

February

5 February

9 February

17 February

22 February

26 February

27 February

Unknown date

March

4 March

13 March

17 March

19 March

20 March

25 March

26 March

30 March

Unknown date

April

1 April

13 April

30 April

Unknown date

May

9 May

Unknown date

June

11 June

14 June

21 June

Unknown date

July

8 July

10 July

18 July

25 July

30 July

Unknown date

August

18 August

Unknown date

September

19 September

22 September

23 September

27 September

29 September

Unknown date

October

5 October

27 October

Unknown date

November

8 November

9 November

11 November

19 November

25 November

Unknown date

December

3 December

4 December

7 December

8 December

11 December

14 December

21 December

Unknown date

Unknown date

References

1784